Aleksei Polyakov (born December 16th, 1985) is a Russian handball player for Zarya Kaspiya and the Russian national team.

References

1985 births
Living people
Russian male handball players
Sportspeople from Tolyatti